Moisés Alcalde Virgen (born 28 July 1971) is a Mexican politician affiliated with the National Action Party. As of 2014 he served as Deputy of the LX Legislature of the Mexican Congress representing the State of Mexico.

References

1971 births
Living people
Politicians from the State of Mexico
National Action Party (Mexico) politicians
21st-century Mexican politicians
Monterrey Institute of Technology and Higher Education alumni
Instituto Tecnológico Autónomo de México alumni
University of Texas at Austin alumni
Academic staff of the Monterrey Institute of Technology and Higher Education
Members of the Congress of the State of Mexico
Deputies of the LX Legislature of Mexico
Members of the Chamber of Deputies (Mexico) for the State of Mexico